Parornix devoniella is a moth of the family Gracillariidae. It is known from all of Europe (except the Iberian Peninsula, the Balkan Peninsula and the Mediterranean islands).

The wingspan is 9–10 mm. The head is whitish mixed with fuscous. Palpi white, apex of second joint and median band of terminal dark fuscous. Forewings are grey irrorated with dark fuscous and whitish; numerous costal strigulae, an indistinct posterior spot in disc preceded by a blackish elongate spot, and suffused dorsal strigulae interrupted by two elongate blackish spots whitish; a black apical dot cilia with three entire dark fuscous lines. Hindwings are grey.
The larva is whitish-green; dorsal line dark green; head brown; segment 2 with four black spots.

Adults are on wing in May and again in August in two generations.

The larvae feed on Corylus avellana, Corylus colurna and Corylus maxima. They mine the leaves of their host plant. The mine consists of a small, rectangular mine between two side veins. The larva starts feeding in the spongy parenchyma. Later also the palissade parenchyma along the outline of the mine is consumed. In the end, all palissade parechyma is eaten away and the mine has become full depth. Most frass is deposited in a corner of the mine. After leaving the mine the larva lives in a folded leaf margin.

References

Parornix
Moths described in 1850
Moths of Europe
Taxa named by Henry Tibbats Stainton